Los Ejes De Mi Carreta (My cart's axles) is a song in the milonga style written by Argentine guitarist turned singer Atahualpa Yupanqui. The song has become a classic for singers from around the world.

The song was written as a form of reflection of the gaucho lifestyle, in which the singer narrates how people complain of his cart's creaking. He states that he doesn't mind it as it breaks the silence he experiences in his daily life. As a final admission, he admits that he'll never grease the axles. The full message narrates a lonesome way of living which is what the narrator takes control of his life's choices.

References 

Argentine songs
Spanish-language songs
Year of song missing